Henri Josse (1828–23 July 1893) was a British politician. He was elected as a Liberal Member of Parliament for Great Grimsby in 1892, resigning in 1893 by becoming Steward of the Manor of Northstead. Josse was a naturalised Frenchman, he was a coal merchant in Grimsby as well as a banker in Paris.

Josee resigned his seat in parliament in February 1893 due to pressure of business, he died a few months later on 23 July 1893.

References

Liberal Party (UK) MPs for English constituencies
1828 births
1893 deaths
UK MPs 1892–1895
Members of the Parliament of the United Kingdom for Great Grimsby